Eri Hozumi was the defending champion, having won the previous edition in 2016, however she lost in the second round to Shérazad Reix.

Dalila Jakupović won the title after defeating Destanee Aiava 6–4, 6–4 in the final.

Seeds

Draw

Finals

Top half

Bottom half

References
Main Draw

2018 ITF Women's Circuit
2018 in Australian tennis
March 2018 sports events in Australia
Sports competitions in Canberra
Tennis in the Australian Capital Territory